Howard Sachs may refer to:

 Howard F. Sachs (born 1925), United States judge
 Howard Sachs (scientist) (1926–2011), American biochemist